Kensington-Malpeque is a provincial electoral district for the Legislative Assembly of Prince Edward Island, Canada.

Members
The riding has elected the following Members of the Legislative Assembly:

Election results

2016 electoral reform plebiscite results

References

External links
 Kensington-Malpeque information

Prince Edward Island provincial electoral districts